The Macc Lads are an English punk rock band from Macclesfield, Cheshire, England. Self-proclaimed the "rudest, crudest, lewdest, drunkest band in Christendom", the Macc Lads have typically used irreverent, foul-mouthed and politically incorrect lyrics; common themes have been binge drinking, sex and fighting. Active from 1981 to 1995 and reforming in 2018, the band now tend to be regarded more favourably by music historians, in contrast to the reaction the band generated in their heyday, with many appreciating the blatant schoolboy humour and tongue-in-cheek nature of the source material.

Concerts
The band were prevented from entering or ejected from gigs in Macclesfield, London, Huddersfield, Bury, Cornwall, Blackpool, Colchester, Hull, Newcastle, Cleethorpes, Northampton, Leeds, Wigan, Lincoln, Bolton, Mansfield, Portsmouth, Cheltenham, and Norwich. They were also banned from entering the United States.

A concert at the Birmingham Hummingbird in 1989 resulted in thousands of pounds' worth of damage by fans. Vandalism included scaffolding being pulled apart and thrown onstage as well as a broken toilet, pots of paint and ashtrays. Band members McCavity and Muttley suffered cut heads and fans went on stage to fight road crew, and stage security members Lockstock and Mungo. At the end of March 1990 the band played at The Marquee Club in Tottenham Court Road, London coincidentally the same day as the Poll Tax Riots were taking place in the streets outside. Many fans were caught in the cross-fire between fighting in the concert venue and the rioting out on the streets. 

The Lads' website states that at a gig in Cheltenham in 1991 a "bag of hot sick" was thrown at the band.

The band played their 500th gig at Nottingham Rock City on 4 December 1995.

Break up, subsequent media appearances and reunion
Before reforming in 2018, the band last performed at a private show in 1997 for Muttley's local football team in Macclesfield. The line-up was the four-piece of Muttley, Winston Dread, Al O'Peesha and Johnny Mard. In 1999 Stez Styx, The Beater, Muttley and Al O'Peesha reunited for an interview at the Ivy House pub, Macclesfield for The Bear's Head fan website. This was conducted by long-term Macc Lads fan and Bear's Head fansite contributor Lance Manley, also known as Liquid Goblin.

On 23 June 2015 The Guardian published an article by Ian Gittins in which he put a satirical interpretation on the Macc Lads' lyrics and said that they had arrived "too early" in music history to not be taken at face value. The article stated that they were ultimately "a coarse yet clever spoof". Muttley McLad himself rejected this description, saying "There was no ulterior motive, The Guardian are reading too much into it. Making us out to be witty, intelligent satirists is probably the worst thing that's ever been said about us."

In November 2015 a five-minute documentary called Coffee, Sex & Johnny Bags by The Beater's son Joe Conning was made and published on 2 January 2016 on YouTube and social media. The video is another reunion of the original line-up with Muttley, The Beater and Stez Styx giving insights into lyrics the band wrote plus reflections on their success. Also contributing was long-term "affiliate" Bammy the Bamster who is mentioned in a couple of the band's songs.

On 25 February 2017, the Macc Lads members Muttley McLad, The Beater, Stez Styx and Chorley the Hord reunited for a gig as F.I.L.F. with Bammy the Bamster on vocals. Although not an official reunion of the Macc Lads, this was the first time in since 1988 that Muttley, Chorley and Beater have played in the same band and the first time that Chorley and Stez have shared a stage. F.I.L.F. are an ongoing project aiming to cover classic punk music, and began closing performances with Macc Lads material at Blackpool's Rebellion Festival. A gig at No.5 Bar in Macclesfield on 10 February 2018 sold out in three days.

On 1 July 2018 Lance Manley published a memoir of his time following the Macc Lads. Entitled Beer, Sweat & Blood: On Tour With The Macc Lads, the book covers the period 1988 to 1999 and the recent reunion.

On 3 August 2018, the Macc Lads reformed to play the Rebellion Festival in Blackpool. The line-up was the same as F.I.L.F. with Bammy on vocals. Two months later Muttley resumed lead vocals, and Bammy stepped aside to become the band's full-time manager. A tour entitled The Usual Subjects took place in November 2018 with all of the gigs sold out.

On 16 November 2019 Lance Manley published a follow-up book entitled From The Cradle To The Gravy: Fan Tales Of The Macc Lads which features short stories and tales from other fans and associates of the band over the years.

On 14 December 2019 the band released their first original material since 2006. A vinyl 7-inch single with the tracks Mary, Queen of Pox and Middle Finger was given away free to all fans attending the final gig of 2019, at the Engine Shed in Lincoln.

In 2020 the Macc Lads began selling their own range of COVID-19 face-masks, featuring a cartoon of a stubbly chin and a mouth holding a lit cigarette. They also released five new songs via their website: "Devil's Handcart", "Best Barbershop", "Black Latrine", "Sunniside Nursing Home" and "Curley Clare". There is a video for "Curly Clare" featuring Muttley and the Beater.

In December 2020 the Macc Lads published a Ladvent calendar on their website. This featured a one-minute track entitled "Let's Get Pissed Again" which was originally featured on the 1982 release "Minge Pies & Mistletoe". Its lyrics were changed to reflect the lockdown over COVID-19. This calendar was repeated with different material in December 2021 and 2022.

In February 2022 the Macc Lads manager Bammy stated that the 2021 tour was possibly the last one with that line-up but material will continue in other forms.

In December 2022 a new song was released on the Ladvent calendar entitled "More Kids". It is about a man lamenting the fact that his children are all now politically correct, vegan and "woke" and surmising that he could always have more children to replace them. It was only available while the Ladvent calendar was active and can no longer be accessed.

Band members

Current members
Muttley McLad, (real name Tristan O'Neill) - lead vocals, bass, songwriting (1981–1995; 1997; 2018–present)
The Beater (real name Geoffrey Conning) – lead guitar, backing vocals (lead vocals on Boddies), (1981–1986, 1986–1989, 1990–1991, 2018–present)
Stez Styx (1st incarnation), later known as Johnny Mard (real name Steve Hatton) – guitars, backing vocals, drums (1981–1986, 1993–1995, 2018–present)
Chorley the Hord (real name Charles Moore) – drums, backing vocals (1986–1989, 2018–present)
Bammy the Bamster - band and tour manager (2018 to present)

Former members
Stez Styx (2nd incarnation, real name Howard Minns, also known as frequent support act Eddie Shit) – drums, backing vocals, lead vocals on "Newcy Brown" (1990–1991)
Phil "Fast Fret" McCavity (real name Phillip Turner) – lead guitar, backing vocals (1989–1990)
Al O'Peesha (real name Peter Bossley, a journalist with The Sentinel) – guitar, piano, backing vocals (1991, 1993–1995, died in 2005 in Stoke-on-Trent)
Cheeky Monkey (real name Percy Perkins) – drums, backing vocals (1985–1986)
Winston Dread (real name Kevin Hooper) – drums, backing vocals (1993–1995)
Uncle Knobby – guitar, backing vocals (1986)

Other members
Bammy the Bamster- lead vocals, 2018
Barrel – Roadie, lead vocals on "Feed Your Face", 1987
Binbag – lead vocals on "Dans Round Us 'Andbags", and "Fluffy Pup", 1989
Stella Strict – lead vocals on "Two Stroke Eddie", live singer of Fluffy Pup in 1990
Young Man – lead vocals on "Failure With Girls", 1985

Timeline
This is an approximate timeline of the members of the Macc Lads.

Discography

Albums
 Eh Up (1983) Hectic House
 Beer & Sex & Chips n Gravy (1985) Hectic House
 Bitter, Fit Crack (1987) Hectic House
 Live at Leeds (the who?) (1988) Dojo
 From Beer to Eternity (1989) Dojo – UK No. 72
 The Beer Necessities (1990) Dojo
 Alehouse Rock (1994) Dojo

EPs
 One Gallon Demo (1982)
 Minge Pies and Mistletoe (1983)
 Macc Lads 5 (fan club only) (1986)
 Filthy, Fat and Flatulent (1987)
 Sheepless Nights (1988)
 ...and Drinking Partners (1989)
 Bog N Roll Circus (1990)
 Turtles' Heads (1991)
 England (2006)

Compilations
 Dirty CD Chips n Gravy (1989)
 Twenty Golden Crates (1991)
 An Orifice and a Genital (Outtakes 1986–1991) (1993) Dojo
 God's Gift to Women (1998)
 The Lads From Macc (1999)
 Anthology (1999)

Videos
 Beer and Sex and Chips 'n' Gravy (1986)
 Made in Macc (1987)
 Four Bleats to the Baa (1988)
 Come to Brum (live in Birmingham) (1988)
 The Three Bears (1989)
 The Quality of Mersey (live in Liverpool) (1989)
 The Beer Necessities (1990)
 Sex, Pies and Videotape (live in Manchester) (1991). The video was produced by EMI. Mutley stated in an interview in 1999 that the final result was "nearly as rude as a school choir".

References

External links
 Official website
 The Macc Lads at discogs.com

English punk rock groups
People from Macclesfield
Comedy rock musical groups
British comedy musical groups
Musical groups established in 1981
1981 establishments in England
Musical groups disestablished in 1995
1995 disestablishments in England
Musical groups established in 2018
2018 establishments in England